The county of Banks is one of the counties of Queensland, Australia, that existed before 1901.  The county is divided into civil  parishes. It is located in Far North Queensland, and is named for Sir Joseph Banks, who with Captain James Cook landed in 1770 at a location within the county. Banks includes the towns of Cooktown, Lakeland and Laura.

Parishes

References

Banks